Mari Khokharan is a remote village in Gujrat District, Central Punjab, Pakistan. It's situated on the bank of the Chenab River.

The residents are mostly farmers, although some have gone to work abroad in order to send their wages home.

Basic amenities

There are four schools in the village: the Government primary school for boys, Govt girls high school and rest two are in private sector
The village has electricity, natural gas, and telephone services. The nearest health center is Rural Health Centre, about six miles away.
GPS coordinates of the village are: Latitude: 32.669171 | Longitude: 74.410059

Transport
Daily bus and van services run between head Marala, Tanda, Sialkot, and Gujrat.  The road is  metalled.

Local council
Mari is a local union council and local body that represents the local 10 or more villages. Members are elected every four years. Elected members of the Union council of Mari then elect the Nazim

See also
Kurree Sharif
Rindheer Khokhran

Populated places in Gujrat District
Villages in Gujrat District
Union councils of Gujrat District